Mini-VGA connectors are a non-standard, proprietary alternative used on some laptops and other systems in place of the standard VGA connector, although most laptops use a standard VGA connector. Apple, HP and Asus  have separate implementations using the same name. Apart from its compact form, mini-VGA ports have the added ability to output both composite and S-Video in addition to VGA signals through the use of EDID.

The mini-DVI and now Mini DisplayPort connectors have largely replaced mini-VGA. Mini-VGA connectors are most commonly seen on Apple's iBooks, eMacs, early PowerBooks (12 inch), and some iMacs (e.g. the iMac G5), but has also been included on several laptops manufactured by Sony.  HP's versions are found in HP Minis and HP TouchSmarts.

The mini-VGA connector can also be used for video output.  In this mode, S-Video chrominance (C) and luminance (Y) signals replace the red and green channels, while an equivalent composite video signal is output on the blue channel.  The horizontal and vertical sync pins are unused.

Samsung Chromebooks, available since June 2011, feature their own implementation of Mini-VGA ports. Various other Samsung laptops, such as the Series 7 and Series 9 versions, also feature this new connector.

References

External links
 iBook Developer Note: External Display Port

Computer connectors